Viva Piñata is a computer animated television series produced by 4Kids Productions and Bardel Entertainment in collaboration with Microsoft, and it is based on the Xbox 360 video game of the same name by Xbox Game Studios and Rare, which was released alongside the TV series. Lloyd Goldfine and Paul Griffin served as executive producers, with Mike deSeve acting as story editor and Anne Bernstein and David Steven Cohen among the series' writers.

Viva Piñata premiered on August 26, 2006 as part of the 4Kids TV programming block, later moving to The CW4Kids before being removed from the schedule on October 25, 2008. In Canada, the series aired on YTV, where its final episode was broadcast on May 18, 2009, and would continue to air in reruns until June 24, 2011. The series also aired on Nicktoons Network and CITV in the UK and on Nickelodeon and ABC Television in Australia.

Synopsis
On Piñata Island, piñatas of various species roam the gardens freely, eating candy and coexisting with one another in a peaceful society. When a piñata's candy inside reaches a high enough level, they are sent to a party via the Piñata Central Cannoñata, where they will be broken open by the partygoers before being repaired and returned to the island. The series follows a group of close piñata friends and their day-to-day lives on the island.

Characters

Main characters
 Hudson Horstachio (voiced by Dan Green): A horse piñata with a green teal body like a pistachio, Hudson is one of the most popular piñatas in the business. As a celebrity he sometimes has to disguise himself when in public. His friends often have to keep his ego in check. He enjoys dancing and making extravagant statements about himself.
 Paulie Pretztail (voiced by Brian Maillard): A cross between a pretzel and a red-tailed fox, Paulie is a no-nonsense kind of pinata who could easily be considered to be "the clever-cloggs" of the main cast (besides Les). He is Fergy's best friend and shares his aversion towards being sent to parties (though it seems more of an annoyance to him, rather than Fergy's idea of thinking of going to a party as frightening). He seems to be good at cooking as shown in the episode ' Recipe for Disaster'.
 Fergy Fudgehog (voiced by David Wills): A cross between fudge and a hedgehog, Fergy loves candy, but fears parties. He is Paulie's best friend, and is frequently sought out by Langston to attend parties but always manages to escape his bugcatcher's net. His catchphrase is "Oh, fudge!"
 Franklin Fizzlybear (voiced by Marc Thompson): A brown grizzly bear with purple and yellow stripes. He enjoys surfing, and typically speaks with a surfer accent and related expressions. He is fairly laid back and occasionally has moments of intellectualism. He is not good at lying. He also draws portraits of the other pinatas. In the video game, his surfboard is an item that the player can purchase.
 Tina & Teddington Twingersnap (voiced by Kathleen Delaney and Jamie McGonnigal): A two-headed serpent crossed with gingersnap. They share a body, but argue a lot. They have both been shown to have sub-par gardening skills. Despite the fact that they appear to hate each other (after all, they are Brother and Sister), in one episode when they are accidentally separated, they end up greatly missing their other half. Teddington is the worst singer on Pinata Island and for some reason has a refined British accent.
 Ella Elephanilla (voiced by Rebecca Soler): A cross between an elephant and vanilla, Ella suffers from short-term memory loss, thus contradicting the saying that an elephant never forgets. She enjoys ballet. Because of her elegant moves, this caused Paulie and Fergy to both get huge, temporary crushes on her. They even asked her to a dance, but she forgot they had both asked her. No evidence has been shown that both Fergy and Paulie still have a crush on her, if they do, they are very subtle about it.
 Les Galagoogoo (voiced by Eric Stuart): A cross between a Galago and GooGoo, Les is smart and dextrous, however, when he speaks, it comes out as high-pitched gibberish. Les ranked second place in the 4Kids Viva Piñata character poll. It appears that the main cast may be able to understand him, but simply ignore him. In one episode, he was able to speak, but he was ignored as he always had been.
 Langston Lickatoad (voiced by Mike Pollock): A cross between a licorice and a toad, Langston operates the Cannoñata. He regularly tries to catch the stealthy duo Fergy and Paulie in order to send them to parties.
 Professor Pester (voiced by David Brimmer): A voodoo-like islander who was the main villain of the series. In all the episodes he appears in, he and his Ruffians try to capture and destroy a piñata, (usually Hudson) if not all of them, to obtain their candy. Note that he does not appear to be a piñata. When he had his personality reversed and happily gobbled up all of Fergy's candy, he was scanned on the way to the Cannoñata and found to have no candy. Nor do any of his ruffians appear to be piñatas; an episode shows that they resided on the island before the arrival of Pester and were partially responsible for the failure of his Sours experiment. His catchphrase is "I have no regrets", and he always says it when his plans backfire and he ends up losing. He and the Ruffians are the only non-pinatas from the games to have made it to the show, though to be noted Leafos makes a split second cameo in the theme song right when the announcer states "Welcome to Pinata Island" as the screen is panning over a field.

Recurring characters
 Beverly Badgesicle: Hudson's biggest, very obsessive fan.
 Cecil Cocoadile: Cecil is the only piñata on the island who thinks Chortles' jokes are funny, causing him to burst into tears laughing. In the piñata world, cocoadile tears make excellent fertilizer, so while laughing and crying at his bad jokes, he is also helping Chortles with his garden.
 Chortles Chippopotamus (voiced by Sean Schemmel): Chortles has a horrible sense of humor, but fantastic gardening skills. Only Cecil Cocoadile thinks his jokes are funny, and Chortles uses Cecil's tears to help his garden grow.
 Dr. Quincy Quackberry: A doctor and psychiatrist with a Groucho Marx-like personality. He wears glasses and a tie, and he customarily tells poor jokes.
 The Great Bonboon (or just "The Bonboon"): A creature who pretends to be an all-knowing guru to steal candy from gullible piñatas like Professor Pester. He is usually meditating, but when no one is present, he talks to his friend Sid on the phone in his normal voice. Paulie is the only pinata who sees through his ruse. 
 King Roario (voiced by Dan Green): The King of Pinata Island.
 Mabel Moozipan: She owns a well-kept vegetable garden and despises trespassers. She is friends with Florence Fizzlybear.
 Pecky Pudgeon (voiced by Eric Stuart): Pecky takes photos for the local newspaper of Piñata Island, the Piñata Yada Yada. He loves gossiping about everyone and will go to great lengths to bring in a juicy scoop for the paper. He makes a cameo in the game taking a photo of Gretchen when she first appears.
 Pierre Parrybo (voiced by Pete Zarustica): Pierre organizes various activities on Piñata Island. He's also the DJ for a call-in radio show.
 Ruffians: Professor Pester's bumbling henchmen who usually ruin his plans, since they don't comprehend orders well. They waddle from side to side in their walk, and they love to prank one another. According to Pester, three are boys and one is a girl.
 Petunia Pretztail (voiced by Sieko Shih): A kung-fu warrior who is friends with Florence Fizzlybear, Francine Fudgehog, and especially Haily Hostachio, and teaches Fergy and Paulie how to find their own "fu".
 Prewitt Profitamole (voiced by Mike MacRae): A brilliant animal who seems to be the only mechanic on the island and he is a wonder at inventing. He also has a love for soaps, and watches them avidly.
 Shirley Shellybean: Shirly is optimistic and always is ready to start a new adventure.
 Simone Cinnamonkey (voiced by Rebecca Soler): Hudson's brisk and resourceful agent. She speaks very quickly, rapidly counting off Hudson's schedule. Sometimes, she seems to want her pay more than Hudson's fame, but she is occasionally shown to care for him in both stern and encouraging ways.

Episodes

Home media
Two episodes, "Chewnicorn in the Garden" and "Horstachio of a Different Color", were released for free download on the Xbox Live Marketplace as sneak peeks prior to the show's release. "Horstachio of a Different Color" was also featured on a bonus disc included with the Special Edition version of the Viva Piñata game.

Shout! Factory released two DVD volumes for Viva Piñata. The first, The Piñatas Must Be Crazy And Other Stories, was released in February 2009 and contains episodes 1-5.

"The Ghost Show," an internet radio show, usually shows various clips from episodes during the weekly broadcasts.

References

External links
 Official website (archive)
 

Viva Piñata
Fox Broadcasting Company original programming
2000s American animated television series
2006 American television series debuts
2009 American television series endings
2000s Canadian animated television series
2006 Canadian television series debuts
2009 Canadian television series endings
American children's animated comedy television series
American children's animated fantasy television series
American computer-animated television series
Animated television series about horses
Animated series based on video games
Works based on Microsoft video games
Canadian children's animated comedy television series
Canadian children's animated fantasy television series
Canadian computer-animated television series
CW4Kids original programming
YTV (Canadian TV channel) original programming
English-language television shows